Leticia Costas Moreira (born 22 March 1990)  is a former professional Spanish tennis player.

On 11 July 2011, she reached her highest singles ranking by the Women's Tennis Association (WTA) of 179. On 23 July 2012, she peaked at No. 170 of the WTA doubles rankings.

In her career, she was coached by Alejo Mancisidor.

In June 2013, Costas announced her retirement from professional tennis.

ITF Circuit finals

Singles: 7 (1 title, 6 runner-ups)

Doubles: 23 (7 titles, 16 runner-ups)

References

External links
 
 

1990 births
Living people
Spanish female tennis players
Sportspeople from Pontevedra